U.S. Route 36 (US 36) is an east–west United States highway that travels approximately  from Rocky Mountain National Park, Colorado to Uhrichsville, Ohio. The highway's western terminus is at Deer Ridge Junction, an intersection in Rocky Mountain National Park, Colorado, where it meets US 34. Its eastern terminus is at US 250 in Uhrichsville, Ohio.

Route description

Colorado

US Route 36 begins at US 34 at Deer Ridge Junction in Rocky Mountain National Park in Colorado, just west of Estes Park. It then passes through Boulder and Denver on its way to Kansas. Between Boulder and Denver, the road that is now US 36 was originally built as the Denver-Boulder Turnpike. It serves today as a major arterial freeway in the Front Range Urban Corridor. Between Denver and Byers, US 36 exists in unsigned overlaps with I-270 and I-70, while some parts of its original route are signed separately as Colorado State Highway 36. After it diverges from I-70 in Byers, US 36 is a relatively lightly-traveled two-lane rural highway to the Kansas state line.

Kansas

US-36 passes through all 13 counties in Kansas which border Nebraska. The highway enters the Sunflower State from Colorado in Cheyenne County, and leaves the state by crossing the Missouri River on the Pony Express Bridges entering Missouri.

The section of US-36 from Washington, Kansas to St. Joseph, Missouri is officially called the Pony Express Highway because it marks the starting section of the Pony Express. It crosses the Missouri River on the Pony Express Bridges. From the western junction with K-383 to the Missouri state line, US-36 is part of the National Highway System.

Except for wider sections in towns and passing lanes on hills, US-36 through Kansas is mostly a two-lane surface road. However some of the principal intersections all along the road are grade-separated diamond interchanges. From the Little Blue River just west of the K-148 junction to the US-77 North junction just west of the Big Blue River at Marysville, US-36 is a four-lane divided surface highway. From Hiawatha to west of Wathena, the road is a two-lane freeway. After passing through Wathena as a surface street (Riverside High School in Wathena fronts the westbound lanes), it becomes a four-lane freeway to the Missouri state line.

Missouri

US 36 across Missouri is a four-lane expressway with some freeway sections, passing through or near St. Joseph, Cameron, Chillicothe, Brookfield, Macon, Monroe City and Hannibal. Between I-35 in Cameron and the Illinois state line, it forms part of the principal route between Kansas City and Chicago.

Illinois

In the state of Illinois, U.S. 36 runs concurrently with much of Interstate 72. It enters from Missouri across the Mississippi River on the Mark Twain Memorial Bridge, and runs east, crossing Interstate 55 in Springfield. At the U.S. Route 51 bypass in Decatur, U.S. 36 leaves I-72 and runs due east through downtown Decatur. U.S. 36 then continues east, through Tuscola and several smaller communities, to the Indiana border.

Indiana

US 36 enters Indiana near Dana in Vermillion County. It then passes through the towns of Montezuma, Rockville, Bainbridge, Danville, and Avon before approaching Indianapolis.  US 36 then joins I-465, traveling around the south side of the city (counter-clockwise in the eastbound direction).  East of the city, US 36 exits onto Pendleton Pike and travels northeast.  It passes through Lawrence, McCordsville, and Fortville before passing around the east side of Pendleton, where the route turns east.  The route then travels mostly in a straight line, passing through Sulphur Springs, Losantville, Modoc, and Lynn before entering Ohio.

The former routing through Indianapolis consisted of Rockville Road, Washington Street, West Street/Michigan Road (the latter once Northwestern Avenue, now Dr. Martin Luther King, Jr. Street), 38th Street, and Pendleton Pike.

Ohio

US 36 enters Ohio in Darke County near the small village of Palestine, after which it passes through Darke, Miami, Champaign, Union, Delaware, Knox, and Coshocton counties before reaching its terminus at Uhrichsville in Tuscarawas County. Within the state, US 36 is classified as 83.1% rural and 16.9% urban with only  coded as freeway (out of  total). The home was demolished in 1926 and the location is marked with a historical monument.

Major intersections

Colorado
  in Deer Ridge Junction
  in Estes Park
  in Westminster
  on the Sherrelwood–Twin Lakes–Welby line. I-270/US 36 travels concurrently to Denver.
  in Welby
  in Commerce City
  in Denver. I-70/US 36 travels concurrently to Byers.
  on the Denver–Aurora city line
  in Aurora. The highways travel concurrently to Byers.
  east of Idalia. The highways travel concurrently to northeast of Idalia.
Kansas
  in Oberlin
  in Norton
  in Phillipsburg. The highways travel concurrently through the city.
  in Smith Center. The highways travel concurrently to south of Lebanon.
  in Belleville
  in Marysville. The highways travel concurrently through the city.
  west of Fairview
  in Hiawatha
Missouri
  in St. Joseph
  in St. Joseph
  in St. Joseph
  in Cameron
  in Cameron
  in Chillicothe
  in Macon
  in Monroe City. The highways travel concurrently to Miller Township.
  in Hannibal. I-72/US 36 travel concurrently to Harristown, Illinois.
Illinois
  in Levee Township
  in Griggsville Township
  southwest of Jacksonville
  in Springfield. The highways travel concurrently through the city.
  in Harristown
  in Tuscola Township
  in Tuscola
  on the Edgar–Ross township line
Indiana
  in Rockville
  in Monroe Township
  in Indianapolis. The highways travel concurrently through the city.
  in Indianapolis. The highways travel concurrently through the city.
  in Indianapolis
  in Indianapolis. The highways travel concurrently through the city.
  in Indianapolis
  in Indianapolis. US 36/US 421 travels concurrently through the city.
  in Indianapolis. The highways travel concurrently through the city.
  in Indianapolis
  in Indianapolis
  in Union Township
  in Lynn
Ohio
  in Neave Township. The highways travel concurrently to Greenville.
  in Piqua
  in Urbana
  in Paris Township. The highways travel concurrently to Marysville.
  in Delaware
  in Berkshire Township
  in Union Township
  in Salem Township
  in Uhrichsville

See also
U.S. Route 136

References

External links

 U.S. 36 Highway Association
 Endpoints of U.S. Highway 36
 Illinois Highway Ends: US 36
 Indiana Highway Ends: US 36

 
United States Numbered Highway System
U.S. Highways in Ohio